The Great Colonial Hurricane of 1635 brushed Virginia and then passed over southeastern New England in August. Accounts of the storm are very limited, but it was likely the most intense hurricane to hit New England since European colonization.

Meteorological history

The first recorded mention of the Great Colonial Hurricane was on August 24, 1635 at the Virginia Colony at Jamestown. It affected Jamestown as a major hurricane, although no references can be found to damage, probably because the hurricane evidently moved past rapidly, well east of the settlement.

Governors John Winthrop of Massachusetts Bay Colony and William Bradford of Plymouth Colony recorded accounts of the Great Colonial Hurricane. Both describe high winds,  storm surges along the south-facing coasts of Massachusetts and Rhode Island, and great destruction.

Impact

Much of the area between Providence, Rhode Island and the Piscataqua River was damaged by the storm, and some damage was still noticeable 50 years later. Governor Bradford wrote that the storm drowned 17 Indians and toppled or destroyed thousands of trees; many houses were also flattened.

The small barque Watch and Wait owned by a Mr. Isaac Allerton foundered in the storm off Cape Ann with 23 people aboard. The only survivors were Antony Thacher and his wife, who reached Thacher Island. Thacher wrote an account of the shipwreck, and John Greenleaf Whittier based his poem The Swan Song of Parson Avery on Thacher's account of the death of Father Joseph Avery in this wreck.  

The highest recorded tide for a New England Hurricane was a  storm tide recorded in some areas. The town of Plymouth suffered severe damage with houses blown down. The wind blew down mile-long swathes in the woods near Plymouth and elsewhere in eastern Massachusetts. It also destroyed Plymouth Colony's Aptucxet Trading Post in Bourne, Massachusetts.

The Boston area did not suffer from the tide as did areas to its south. The nearest surge swept over the low-lying tracts of Dorchester, ruining the farms and landscape, according to the accounts of Bradford and Winthrop.

The ships James and Angel Gabriel had just anchored off the New England coast, full of colonial settlers from England, and they were caught in the storm. The James survived but the Angel Gabriel was wrecked at Pemaquid, Maine. An account from The Cogswells in America states: "'The storm was frightful at Pemaquid, the wind blowing from the northeast, the tide rising to a very unusual height, in some places more than twenty feet right up and down; this was succeeded by another and unaccountable tidal wave still higher.' The Angel Gabriel became a total wreck, passengers, cattle, and goods were all cast upon the angry waves. Three or four passengers and one seaman perished, and there was the loss of cattle and much property."

Modern analysis
The Hurricane Research Division of the Atlantic Oceanographic and Meteorological Laboratory of NOAA has conducted a re-analysis project to re-examine the National Hurricane Center's data about historic hurricanes. Brian Jarvinen used modern hurricane and storm surge computer models to recreate a storm consistent with contemporaneous accounts of the colonial hurricane. He estimated that the storm was probably a Cape Verde-type hurricane considering its intensity, which took a track similar to the Great Atlantic Hurricane of 1944 and Hurricane Edna of 1954. The storm's eye would have struck Long Island before moving between Boston and Plymouth. This would be the most intense known hurricane landfall north of Cape Fear, North Carolina if accurate. Jarvinen noted that the colonial hurricane may have caused the highest storm surge along the east coast in recorded history at  near the head of Narragansett Bay. He concluded that "this was probably the most intense hurricane in New England history."

An erosional scarp in the western Gulf of Maine may be a trace of the Great Colonial Hurricane.

See also

List of tropical cyclones
List of Atlantic hurricanes
List of New England hurricanes
Angel Gabriel (ship)

References

Further reading

Chapman, D. J. "Our southern summer storm." Report from National Weather Service Office, Norfolk, Virginia.

External links
The Great Hurricane of 1635 and the Legend of Thacker Island by Keith C. Heidorn
Woods Hole Currents: Digging Into Hurricanes 
Timeline: U.S. Storm Disasters
Hurricane timeline: 1495 to 1800

1635
1635
Hurricanes in New England
1635 natural disasters
1635 in the Thirteen Colonies